The Wynne House is a historic house on 4th Street in Fordyce, Arkansas.   The two story wood-frame house was built in 1914, and is the city's best example of residential Classical Revival architecture.  It is Foursquare in plan, with a hip roof with large gable dormers projecting.  A porch wraps around two sides, featuring elaborate spindled balusters and Ionic columns.

The house was listed on the National Register of Historic Places in 1983.

See also
National Register of Historic Places listings in Dallas County, Arkansas

References

Houses on the National Register of Historic Places in Arkansas
Neoclassical architecture in Arkansas
Houses completed in 1914
Houses in Dallas County, Arkansas
Buildings and structures in Fordyce, Arkansas
National Register of Historic Places in Dallas County, Arkansas